Nélida Gómez de Navajas (July 23, 1927 – May 2, 2012) was an Argentine human rights activist. She was one of the founding members of the Grandmothers of the Plaza de Mayo. Gómez's daughter, Cristina Silvia Navajas de Santucho, was kidnapped on July 13, 1976. It was later discovered that Cristina was two months pregnant at the time of her kidnapping. It was believed that Gómez's grandchild was born in the Campo de Mayo in February 1977, though neither has ever been found.

Nélida Gómez de Navajas actively searched for her missing grandchild for the rest of her life. She also devoted her time to activism on behalf of her daughter and the estimated 13,000 people who disappeared during the Dirty War. 

She was also the Vice President of the Instituto Multimedia DerHumALC, which organizes the Festival Internacional de Cine de Derechos Humanos, a human rights film festival.

Nélida Gómez de Navajas died on May 2, 2012.

References

1927 births
2012 deaths
Grandmothers of the Plaza de Mayo
Argentine human rights activists
Women human rights activists
People from Buenos Aires